Roseomonas stagni is a species of Gram-negative, strictly aerobic, coccobacilli-shaped, pink-colored bacterium. It was first isolated from sediment from pond water in Shizuoka, Japan, and the species was first proposed in 2008. The species name is derived from Latin stagni (of a pond).

The optimum growth temperature for R. stagni is 30 °C, but can grow in the 20-35 °C range. The optimum pH is 8.0 and can grow at pH 7.0-10.0.

References

External links 

Type strain of Roseomonas stagni at BacDive -  the Bacterial Diversity Metadatabase

Rhodospirillales
Bacteria described in 2008